Steven Leroy dePyssler (July 21, 1919 – July 25, 2020) was an officer of the United States Air Force.

Life
He was the only American known to have participated in six military engagements: World War II, Korean War, First Indochina War, Bay of Pigs Invasion, Vietnam War and the Dominican Civil War. He died from COVID-19 on July 25, 2020,  four days after his 101st birthday during the COVID-19 pandemic in Louisiana.

References

1919 births
2020 deaths
Military personnel from Chicago
American centenarians
Men centenarians
United States Army Air Forces soldiers
United States Army Air Forces officers
United States Army Air Forces personnel of World War II
United States Air Force personnel of the Korean War
United States Air Force personnel of the Vietnam War
Deaths from the COVID-19 pandemic in Louisiana